Dynein light chain 4, axonemal is a protein that in humans is encoded by the DNAL4 gene.

References

Further reading

External links